Hypoxis hemerocallidea, the African star grass or African potato, is a medicinal plant in the Hypoxidaceae family. It is native to southern Africa from South Africa as far north as Mozambique and Zimbabwe. This plant is the best known member of this genus.

Medicinal uses
Hypoxis is promoted as an alternative medicine treatment for benign prostatic hyperplasia, but research has found no evidence of beneficial effect.  Additionally, one study suggests Hypoxis alters the activity of cytochrome P450, suggesting that it may interfere with the effectiveness of other drugs or supplements, such as antiretroviral drugs.

References

External links

 Hypoxis hemerocallidea research University Kwazulu-Natal 
 Hypoxis hemerocallidea South African National Biodiversity Institute 

hemerocallidea
Flora of Southern Africa
Medicinal plants of Africa
Plants described in 1842